Michael Rogers may refer to:

Politics and military
 Mike Rogers (Alabama politician) (born 1958), U.S. Representative from Alabama
 Mike Rogers (Maryland politician) (born 1964), state legislator
 Mike Rogers (Michigan politician) (born 1963), former U.S. Representative from Michigan
 Michael Rogers (Oklahoma politician) (born 1978), Oklahoma Secretary of State
 Michael S. Rogers (born 1959), director of the National Security Agency
 Michael Rogers (North Carolina politician) in North Carolina General Assembly of 1777
 F. Michael Rogers (1921–2014), U.S. Air Force general

Sports
 Mike Rogers (ice hockey) (born 1954), NHL hockey player,  Hartford Whalers, New York Rangers, Edmonton Oilers 
 Michael Rogers (cyclist) (born 1979), Australian professional road bicycle racer
 Michael Rogers (racing driver) in 2008 Australian Superkart season
 Mike Rogers (sailor) on List of World Championships medalists in sailing

Other people
 Bela Matina, an actor credited as "Mike Rogers" in The Wizard of Oz (1939)
 Michael A. Rogers, author and futurist
 Michael Rogers (actor) (born 1964), Canadian television and film actor
 Michael Rogers (publisher) (born 1963), American publisher, fundraiser, gay rights leader, and former blogger
 Michael John Rogers (1932–2006), English ornithologist
 Michael Rogers, bass player in the band Peel
 Mike Rogers (Batman: Legends of the Dark Knight 44) on List of DC Comics characters: M
 Mike Rogers, actor in The Somme – From Defeat to Victory
 Mike Rogers (producer), radio DJ in Tokyo

See also
 Michael Rodgers (disambiguation)
 Mick Rogers (disambiguation)